Gi-ung or Ki-woong is a Korean masculine given name. Its meaning differs based on the hanja used to write each syllable of the name. There are 68 hanja with the reading "gi" and two hanja with the reading "ung" on the South Korean government's official list of hanja which may be used in given names.

People with this name include:
Kang Ki-woong (강기웅, born 1965), South Korean baseball player, competed in Baseball at the 1984 Summer Olympics
Park Ki-woong (born 1985), South Korean actor
Bae Gi-ung, South Korean boxer, represented South Korea at the 1996 Summer Olympics
Kim Ki-woong, one of victims of the sinking of the MV Sewol

See also
List of Korean given names

References

Korean masculine given names